Mikhail Kruglov (Russian: Михаил Круглов) is a Russian opera, folk and choir singer possessing a strong low-ranging oktavist voice. Kruglov was born in Siberia in 1972.

Biography

The artist has an active concert career.

References

Sources
http://miedzywschodemazachodem.art.pl/ludzie/kroglov.htm
http://thebassoprofondoblog.blogspot.ch/search?q=Mikhail+Kruglov

Further reading 
Morosan, Vladimir Choral Performance in Pre-revolutionary Russia, UMI Research Press, 1986.  
Rommereim, J. C., "The Choir and How to Direct It: Pavel Chesnokov's magnum opus", Choral Journal, Official Publication of the American Choral Directors Association, XXXVIII, no. 7, 1998

See also
 Oktavist
 Basso Profondo
 Russian Orthodox chant

1972 births
Living people
Operatic basses
21st-century Russian male opera singers